Alpheus Hyatt (April 5, 1838 – January 15, 1902) was an American zoologist and palaeontologist.

Biography 
Alpheus Hyatt II was born in Washington, D.C. to Alpheus Hyatt and Harriet Randolph (King) Hyatt.  He briefly attended the Maryland Military Academy and Yale University, and after graduating from Harvard University in 1862, he enlisted as a private in the Massachusetts Volunteer Infantry for the Civil War, emerging with the rank of captain.

After the war he worked for a time at the Essex Institute (now the Peabody Essex Museum in Salem, Massachusetts.  He and a colleague founded American Naturalist and Hyatt served as editor from 1867 to 1870.  He became a professor of paleontology and zoology at Massachusetts Institute of Technology in 1870, where he taught for eighteen years, and was professor of biology and zoology at Boston University from 1877 until his death in 1902. He also served as curator of the Boston Society of Natural History, where his longtime assistant was his former student Jennie Maria Arms Sheldon, and he established a laboratory at the Norwood-Hyatt House in 1879 for the study of Marine Biology in Annisquam, Massachusetts. The River Road building gave him access to the Annisquam River, a salt water estuary. This enterprise was moved to Woods Hole and became the Woods Hole Marine Biological Laboratory in 1888.

Hyatt studied under Louis Agassiz and was a proponent of Neo-Lamarckism with Edward Drinker Cope. In 1869, the American Academy of Arts and Sciences elected him a fellow and in 1875, he was elected a member of the National Academy of Sciences. In 1898, he received the honorary degree of LL.D. from Brown University.

He and his wife, Audella Beebe, were the parents of famed sculptor Anna Hyatt Huntington; their other children were Harriet Randolph Hyatt Mayor, who was also a sculptor though less well known, (and mother of the art historian A. Hyatt Mayor), and Alpheus Hyatt III.

Publications

References

External links 

 
 
 
National Academy of Sciences Biographical Memoir

1838 births
1902 deaths
Harvard University alumni
Yale University alumni
American paleontologists
19th-century American zoologists
American marine biologists
Lamarckism
Members of the United States National Academy of Sciences
Fellows of the Boston Society of Natural History
Scientists from Washington, D.C.
Massachusetts Institute of Technology School of Science faculty
Boston University faculty